Vulsirea is a genus of stink bugs in the family Pentatomidae. There are at least two described species in Vulsirea.

Species
These two species belong to the genus Vulsirea:
 Vulsirea nigrorubra Spinola, 1837
 Vulsirea violacea (Fabricius, 1803)

References

Further reading

 
 
 
 
 
 
 
 

Pentatomidae genera
Pentatomini